OAK Racing is an endurance racing team specialising in sports prototypes based in Le Mans, France. In 2013 it won the 24 Hours of Le Mans in LMP2 class and the 2013 FIA WEC World Champion drivers and teams on LMP2 class.

In 2012 the team contested the FIA World Endurance Championship with LMP1 and LMP2 prototypes (including the blue riband Le Mans 24 Hours) as well as the European Le Mans Series, which caters for LMP2 cars only. After a number of successful years in the LMP2 class the team stepped up to the premier LMP1 category in 2011.

The team competes in the famous orange and blue racing livery of Gulf Oil in both championships through its partnership with CAR OIL, Gulf Lubricants’ exclusive distributor for France, Belgium and Luxembourg. Powered by Honda Performance Development (LMP1) and Nissan (LMP2) engines, OAK Racing has been the official LMP1 development team for Dunlop since 2009 and uses the company’s rubber in both prototype classes.

In 2012 OAK Racing became a racecar manufacturer through its Onroak Automotive division. Following the formation of its Design Office in 2010, the company was first responsible for the updated OAK/Pescarolo LMP1 that raced in 2011 before developing the all-new Morgan 2012 LMP2 to the ACO's cost capped regulations in time for the 2012 season. Privateer outfits have been able to purchase the chassis since December 2011.

Since late 2006 OAK Racing has been owned by entrepreneur and racing driver Jacques Nicolet via his holding company Everspeed.

History

Founded by Serge Saulnier in 1980, the team began life in the French Formula 3 championship as Promatecme before becoming Saulnier Racing in 2000 when it entered the World Series by Nissan and, later, its successor the World Series by Renault. In 2006 they switched their attention to sports-prototypes and the Le Mans Series, competing in the LMP1 category.

Nicolet assumed control of the team in late 2006, remaining in the LMS with a switch to the LMP2 class for the following season. In 2008 OAK Racing embarked on a more ambitious programme by fielding a pair of Pescarolo-Judds, one in LMP1 and another in LMP2. This was rewarded with a third place LMP2 class finish at the Le Mans 24 Hours where the team ran one of the youngest crews ever to contest the race at an average age 24, and also fielded the first Chinese driver ever to enter the event.

The team officially became OAK Racing in 2009. A partnership with Mazda Automobiles France was formed at this time with OAK Racing entering two Pescarolo-Mazda LMP2s in the 2009 Le Mans Series and Le Mans 24 Hours as well as participating in the two Asian Le Mans Series events at Japan’s Okayama circuit. By the end of the season the team had achieved six podiums from eight races, including a top-three LMP2 finish at the Le Mans 24 Hours and a victory in the Asian Le Mans Series.

In December 2009 OAK Racing reached an agreement with Pescarolo Sport to take over the manufacturing side of its business. Consequently, the
development and construction of the chassis, bodywork and spare parts of the Pescarolo prototypes was assumed by OAK Racing, as well as
all commercial activities.

In 2010 the team fielded two LMP2-spec Judd-powered OAK-Pescarolos in both the Le Mans Series and the Le Mans 24 Hours whilst also entering the ACO’s new Intercontinental Le Mans Cup. Their efforts were rewarded with numerous titles and podium finishes, including a third consecutive top-three finish at the 24 Hours in LM P2 (taking second and fourth places), four podiums from five LMS events, the ILMC LMP2 class title and the Michelin Green X Challenge trophy in the LMS and ILMC.

On 15 October 2010, during the asset sale of Pescarolo Sport, OAK Racing owner Nicolet and Prestige Racing’s Joël Rivière joined forces to purchase the lots, later presenting them to Henri Pescarolo and thus allowing him to revive his team.

For the 2011 season the team entered two OAK-Pescarolo LMP1 prototypes and capped the Intercontinental Le Mans Cup season with a third place overall finish at the 6 Hours of Silverstone. OAK Racing entered as well one OAK-Pescarolo, LMP2 in the ILMC and an additional LMP2 for the Le Mans 24 Hours. Meanwhile, the team also finished 2nd overall in the LMP2 class standings.

For 2012 OAK Racing split the design, manufacturing, and sales divisions of the team into an independent company named Onroak Automotive. Onroak launched a revised LMP2 that, as well as being raced by the team, would be made available for sale to privateer outfits ahead of the 2012 season. Following a partnership with the Morgan Motor Company, the car was branded as Morgan LMP2.

After a 20-year absence an FIA-sanctioned World Endurance Championship was revived in 2012. OAK Racing initially entered a single car in both prototype classes and saw its #24 Morgan-Judd 2012 LMP2 take pole position and finish second on debut at the season-opening 12 Hours of Sebring.

A second, Nissan-engined Morgan 2012 LMP2 (#35) was entered at the subsequent Spa, Le Mans 24 Hours, Silverstone, São Paulo and Bahrain rounds in a move that ultimately saw the #24 car also switch to Nissan power from the British round onwards. Meanwhile, numerous engine reliability issues prompted the team to withdraw its LMP1 car from the championship after Le Mans. Following the installation of a new HPD engine the car made its competitive WEC return for the two last rounds in Asia.

At the 2013 24 Hours of Le Mans, OAK Racing took the LMP2 class victory with a 1-2 finish (7th and 8th overall). Car No.35 first place, drivers Martin Plowman, Ricardo González and Bertrand Baguette. Car No. 24 second place, drivers Olivier Pla, Alex Brundle and David Heinemeier Hansson. Car No. 35 covered a total of 329 laps in the Circuit de la Sarthe. Car No. 24 one lap behind. The race was run in very difficult weather conditions and several serious accidents bringing out a record of twelve safety car caution periods.

OAK Racing earned both titles in the 2013 FIA World Endurance Championship, first and second places in the LMP2 Drivers and Teams Endurance Trophies class. Car No. 35 (Plowman, González and Baguette), first place and car No. 24 (Pla, Brundle and Hansson), second place.

For 2014, the team joined the newly formed United SportsCar Championship in the United States with full season drivers Olivier Pla and Gustavo Yacaman, winning their first race at Canadian Tire Motorsport Park.

Drivers

1980–2006: Serge Saulnier as president

Since 2007: Jacques Nicolet as president

Racing CV

As Promatecme 
 Single-seater
1992: French F3 champion with Franck Lagorce

1997: British Formula 3 Championship: 2nd (eight wins)

1998: British Formula 3 Championship: 2nd (six wins)

1999: British Formula 3 Championship: 3rd (three wins)

As Saulnier Racing 
 Single-seater
2001: French F3 champion with Ryo Fukuda

2004-2005: World Series by Renault

 Endurance Racing
2006: Le Mans Series, 4th (two podiums)

2007: Le Mans Series, 4th in LMP2 (one podium) - Courage-AER LC75

2008: 24 Hours of Le Mans, 3rd in LMP2 and 12th in LMP1 - Pescarolo-Judd

2008: 5th in LMP2 (one podium) and 12th in LMP1 - Pescarolo-Judd

As OAK Racing 
 2009
Le Mans 24 Hours: 3rd in LMP2 - Pescarolo-Mazda

Asian Le Mans Series: winner in LMP2 (two wins) - Pescarolo-Mazda

Le Mans Series: 6th (two podiums) and 7th (one podium) in LMP2 - Pescarolo-Mazda

 2010
Le Mans 24 Hours: 2nd and 4th in LMP2, 7th and 9th overall — Pescarolo-Judd

Le Mans Series: 3rd (one podium) and 4th (three podiums) in LMP2 - Pescarolo-Judd constructors’ title in LMP2

Intercontinental Le Mans Cup: winner in LMP2 (three podiums) - Pescarolo-Judd

Michelin Green X Challenge (Le Mans Series and ILMC): winner — Pescarolo-Judd

 2011
Le Mans 24 Hours: 5th in LMP2 - OAK/Pescarolo-Judd

6 Hours of Silverstone: 3rd and 5th overall — OAK/Pescarolo-Judd

6 Hours of Zhuhai: Michelin Green X Challenge for the #24 LMP1 - OAK/Pescarolo-Judd

Intercontinental Le Mans Cup: 5th in LMP1 class, 2nd in LMP2 class (team ranking) - OAK/Pescarolo-Judd

2012 LMP2 Trophy

WeatherTech SportsCar Championship wins

References

Timeline

External links
OAK Racing website

French auto racing teams
European Le Mans Series teams
Formula 3 Euro Series teams
24 Hours of Le Mans teams
FIA World Endurance Championship teams
British Formula Three teams
Everspeed
WeatherTech SportsCar Championship teams
French Formula 3 teams
German Formula 3 teams
Formula BMW teams
World Series Formula V8 3.5 teams
French racecar constructors
Auto racing teams established in 1980